Cameron Lawrence (born August 7, 1992 in Orlando, Florida) is an American professional racing driver and 2015 North American Endurance Cup (NAEC) champion in the GTD class in the IMSA WeatherTech SportsCar Championship.

Racing career
Lawrence began his professional racing career in 2011, where he drove for Miller Racing in the SCCA Trans-Am Series TA2 Class and finished third in his debut race at Road Atlanta. In 2013, Lawrence competed in the Trans-Am Series with Miller Racing in a Dodge Challenger in the TA2 Class where he claimed victory in eight of the championship's ten rounds en route to his first professional championship. At 21 years old, Lawrence also became the youngest champion in the Trans-Am Series' entire history. 

For 2014, Lawrence took an additional seven wins and a second-straight TA2 class championship with Miller Racing. In 2015, Lawrence returned for a third season with Miller Racing in TA2 where he took four more victories and led the championship heading into the final round at Daytona International Speedway where he, after starting 26th due to a red flag during qualifying, passed 15 cars in the opening three laps before he was forced to pit with mechanical issues, effectively costing him a third-straight championship.

Lawrence joined Riley Technologies at the beginning of the 2015 United SportsCar Championship where competed in the No. 93 Viper Exchange/TI Automotive Dodge Viper. At the 2015 24 Hours of Daytona, Lawrence took the GTD class win on his first attempt alongside teammates Al Carter, Dominik Farnbacher, Ben Keating, and Kuno Wittmer. Lawrence continued the 2015 North American Endurance Cup (NAEC) season with fourth place at the 12 Hours of Sebring and a win at the 6 Hours of Watkins Glen. At Petit Le Mans, Lawrence took his first WeatherTech SportsCar Championship pole in his first qualifying attempt in the series, narrowly beating out the Porsches of Leh Keen and Spencer Pumpelly in the final minute of a severely wet qualifying session. In the race, Lawrence and teammates Al Carter and Marc Goossens ran at or near the top of the field all day before they finished third, clinching the North American Endurance Cup (NAEC) in the GTD Class for Lawrence and Carter.

Lawrence made his Prototype (P) Class debut at the 2016 12 Hours of Sebring driving for Alegra Motorsports in their BMW-powered PokerStars/inSync Riley Daytona Prototype alongside Dominik Farnbacher, Daniel Morad, and Carlos de Quesada. Lawrence ran as high as fourth overall before electrical issues forced the team to take an extended pitstop which put the car well outside the top ten.  Lawrence competed in select Continental Tire SportsCar Challenge races in the ST class with Honda of America Racing Team (HART) where he finished second at Circuit of the Americas and finished top-10 in six out of eight races. Lawrence returned to IMSA WeatherTech SportsCar Championship for Petit Le Mans where he competed with Turner Motorsports in the No. 97 BMW M6 GT3 and finished third with teammates Michael Marsal and Markus Palttala.

In 2017, Lawrence competed with Class Auto Motorsports in the Trans-Am Series presented by Pirelli Tire where he finished fourth in the TA2 season championship with eight top five finishes. Lawrence earned his first win in the TA class at Brainerd International Raceway with Derhaag Motorsports.

Lawrence competed in his first international races in 2018 with the Creventic 24 Hours of Dubai in Dubai, United Arab Emirates with Sorg Rennsport and the Bathurst 12 Hours in Bathurst, Australia with MARC Cars. Lawrence returned to Turner Motorsports for the Rolex 24 Hours of Daytona with co-drivers Don Yount, Mark Kvamme, Jens Klingmann and Martin Tomczyk.

In 2021, Lawrence joined Reaume Brothers Racing for his NASCAR Camping World Truck Series debut at Circuit of the Americas. Despite qualifying a team-record seventh, he finished last due to mechanical problems.

Personal life
Lawrence graduated from the University of Central Florida with a B.A. in Business Management and a minor in Marketing in 2015. He currently resides in Austin, Texas with his wife, Morgan.

Motorsports career results

IMSA WeatherTech SportsCar Championship series results
(key) (Races in bold indicate pole position; races in italics indicate fastest lap)

† Lawrence did not complete sufficient laps in order to score full points.
HTP Winward Motorsport

24 Hours of Daytona
(key)

NASCAR
(key) (Bold – Pole position awarded by qualifying time. Italics – Pole position earned by points standings or practice time. * – Most laps led.)

Xfinity Series

Camping World Truck Series

 Season still in progress
 Ineligible for series points

References

External links
 
 

Living people
1992 births
Sportspeople from Orlando, Florida
Racing drivers from Florida
24 Hours of Daytona drivers
WeatherTech SportsCar Championship drivers
Trans-Am Series drivers
University of Central Florida alumni
24H Series drivers
NASCAR drivers
Michelin Pilot Challenge drivers